{{Taxobox
| domain = Bacteria
| phylum = Bacillota
| classis = Bacilli
| ordo = Bacillales
| familia = Thermoactinomycetaceae
| genus = Desmospora
| species = D. profundinema
| binomial = Desmospora profundinema| binomial_authority = Zhang et al. 2015
| type_strain = DSM 45903, NBRC 109626, SCSIO 11154
| subdivision = 
| synonyms =
}}Desmospora profundinema'''''  is a bacterium from the genus of Desmospora which has been isolated from deep-sea sediments from the Indian Ocean near China.

References

External links
Type strain of Desmospora profundinema at BacDive -  the Bacterial Diversity Metadatabase	

Bacillales
Bacteria described in 2015